The 2003 WNBA season was the sixth for the Detroit Shock. The Shock won the WNBA Finals for the first time in franchise history. This season was better known as, "From Worst To First".

Offseason

Dispersal Draft

WNBA Draft
Cheryl Ford (daughter of NBA great Karl Malone) helped the Detroit Shock win a WNBA Championship in her first season.

Regular season

Season standings

Season Schedule

Player stats
Note: GP= Games played; FG = Field Goals; MIN= Minutes; REB= Rebounds; AST= Assists; STL = Steals; BLK = Blocks; PTS = Points

Playoffs

Awards and honors
 Ruth Riley, WNBA Finals MVP Award
 Cheryl Ford, WNBA Rookie of the Year Award
 Bill Laimbeer, WNBA Coach of the Year Award

References

External links 
Shock on Basketball Reference

Detroit Shock seasons
Detroit
Detroit Shock
Eastern Conference (WNBA) championship seasons
Women's National Basketball Association championship seasons